Scombrini, commonly called the true mackerels, is a tribe of ray-finned bony fishes in the mackerel family, Scombridae – a family it shares with the Spanish mackerel, tuna and bonito tribes, plus the butterfly kingfish.

This tribe consists of seven species in two genera:
 Scomber Linnaeus, 1758
 Scomber australasicus Cuvier, 1832, Blue mackerel
 Scomber colias Gmelin, 1789, Atlantic chub mackerel
 Scomber japonicus, Houttuyn, 1782, Chub mackerel
 Scomber scombrus Linnaeus, 1758, Atlantic mackerel

 Rastrelliger Jordan & Starks in Jordan & Dickerson, 1908
 Rastrelliger brachysoma (Bleeker, 1851), Short mackerel
 Rastrelliger faughni Matsui, 1967, Island mackerel
 Rastrelliger kanagurta (Cuvier, 1816), Indian mackerel

References

External links

Scombridae
Taxa named by Charles Lucien Bonaparte